Lent, in Western Christianity, is the period before the Christian holy day of Easter.

Lent may also refer to:

Christian observances
 Great Lent, in Eastern Christianity, the period that corresponds to Western Lent
 Jack o' Lent, an event in Medieval England involving the burning of an effigy of Judas Iscariot made of straw and rags
 Lent Event, community based Christian social justice movement 
 Lent in Malta, numerous religious traditions, most of them inherited from one generation to the next, that are part of the Paschal celebrations in the Maltese Islands

Places
 Lent, Ain, a commune in Ain, France
 Lent, Jura, a commune in Jura, France
 Lent, Netherlands, a village in the municipality of Nijmegen, Netherlands
 Lent Township, Chisago County, Minnesota, a township in the U.S.
 Lent Homestead and Cemetery, a historic cemetery in New York City
 Lent, Maribor, an old part of Maribor, Slovenia

People with the surname
 Abraham Lent (1789–1873), Nova Scotia politician
 Abraham Lent (New York City) (1815–1882), New York politician
 Arie van Lent (b. 1970), Dutch-German footballer
 Berkeley Lent (1921–2007), American politician and jurist in the state of Oregon 
 Blair Lent (1930–2009), American author and illustrator of mostly Chinese-themed books 
 Helmut Lent (1918–1944), German night fighter ace in World War II
 James Lent (1782–1833),  U.S. Representative from New York
 James Lent (Nova Scotia politician) (1753–1838)
 John Lent (b. 1948), Canadian poet and novelist 
 Michael Lent (visual artist), co-creator and publisher of Toby Room magazine 
 Norman F. Lent (1931–2012), Conservative Republican member of the United States House of Representatives from New York
 Willis Lent (1904–1959), rear admiral in the United States Navy

Art, entertainment, and media
 Lent (album), an album by Dallas Crane
 Lent Festival, arts festival in Lent, Maribor, Slovenia
 Lent Talks, a series of talks, normally broadcast on BBC Radio in the United Kingdom, to mark the Christian season of Lent
 The Fight Between Carnival and Lent (1559), an oil-on-panel work painted by Pieter Bruegel the Elder
 Lent, a 2019 fantasy novel by Jo Walton

Events
 "Buddhist Lent", a commonly used term for Vassa or Rains Retreat, a three-month annual retreat observed by Theravada practitioners in Burma, which takes place during the wet season
 Lent term, spring academic term at certain British universities

Sports
 Lent Bumps or Lents, a set of rowing races held annually in Cambridge

See also 
 Lending
 Lentic ecosystem, a lake ecosystem
 Lenting, a municipality in the district of Eichstätt in Bavaria, Germany 
 Lento (disambiguation)
 Lents (disambiguation)
 Lint (disambiguation)